Moses M. Costa, C.S.C. (17 November 1950 – 13 July 2020) was a Bangladeshi Roman Catholic prelate, who served as the archbishop of the Roman Catholic Archdiocese of Chittagong, Bangladesh. until his death on 13 July 2020.

Early life 
Costa was born on 17 November 1950 in Dhaka, Bangladesh.

Priesthood 
Costa was ordained a holy priest of the Congregation of Holy Cross on 5 February 1981.

Episcopate 
On 5 July 1996, Costa was appointed bishop of the Roman Catholic Diocese of Dinajpur and consecrated on 6 September 1996 by Adriano Bernardini. On 6 April 2011 he was appointed bishop of the Roman Catholic Archdiocese of Chittagong and was installed on 27 May 2011. He was appointed Archbishop of the Roman Catholic Archdiocese of Chittagong on 2 February 2017 by Pope Francis.

Health and death 
On 13 June 2020, Costa was admitted to hospital after resulting positive to COVID-19, but later recovered from the disease. On 9 July 2020, Costa suffered a stroke, and was put on life support two days later. He died 13 July, due to complications of the stroke.

References 

1950 births
2020 deaths
People from Dhaka
Bishops appointed by Pope Francis
21st-century Roman Catholic archbishops in Bangladesh
20th-century Roman Catholic bishops in Bangladesh
Congregation of Holy Cross bishops
Notre Dame College, Dhaka alumni
Roman Catholic bishops in Bangladesh
Roman Catholic bishops of Chittagong
Roman Catholic archbishops of Chittagong
Roman Catholic bishops of Dinajpur